Pietra Marazzi is a comune (municipality) in the Province of Alessandria in the Italian region Piedmont, located about  east of Turin and about  northeast of Alessandria.

Pietra Marazzi borders the following municipalities: Alessandria, Montecastello, and Pecetto di Valenza.

References

Cities and towns in Piedmont